Knoxville Municipal Airport (also known as Jim Bellamy Field)  is an airport in Knoxville, Iowa, United States.

References

External links 
 

Airports in Iowa
Transportation buildings and structures in Marion County, Iowa